(born December 23 in Aichi Prefecture) is a Japanese shojo manga artist. Two of her major works are Omukae desu and Faster than a Kiss. Pearl Pink was released in English by Tokyopop. Young Master's Revenge, or Kimi no Koto nado Zettai ni  &  Meteor Prince are both released in English by Viz Media.

Works

References

 Interview with Meca Tanaka at Hakusensha

External links
  

Women manga artists
Manga artists from Aichi Prefecture
Japanese female comics artists
Female comics writers
21st-century Japanese writers
21st-century Japanese women writers
Living people
Year of birth missing (living people)